Bainum may refer to:

People with the surname
Duke Bainum (1952–2009), American politician
Stewart W. Bainum, Sr. (1919-2014), American businessman and philanthropist
Stewart W. Bainum, Jr. (born 1946), American businessman and philanthropist